Pedococcus is a genus of Gram positive, aerobic, non-endosporeforming bacteria.

References

Intrasporangiaceae
Bacteria genera